Dhaymoole is an archaeological site in the Sahil province of Somaliland. The site is a cave that contains a collection of ancient rock drawings showing a variety of animals as well as some unidentified symbols. These drawings were created during the third millennium BC.

The walls of the cave are full of infilled and outlined white camels, unidentified quadrupeds and symbols. Most of the quadrupeds are schematic and depicted upright facing right. The Caves of Dhaymoole are believed to be about 3000 to 5000 years old.

The Dhaymoole cave depicts the place of sunset and sunrise, with the Sun on one side and the moon on the other side. It also depicts a camel, giraffe,  elephant and other  wild animals, many of which have become extinct in the region. There are also incomprehensible letters and many circles drawn in a cave.

Gallery

See also

 Caves in Somaliland
 Laas Geel
 Dhambalin
 History of Somaliland

References 

Archaeological sites in Somaliland
Rock art in Africa
Sahil, Somaliland
Caves of Somaliland
Prehistoric Africa